For an African prince, see Prince Mbanga.

Mbanga is a town in western Cameroon.

Transport 

The city is a junction station on the western network of Camrail.

Farming 
Mbanga is a small town in the Littoral Region of Cameroon. There are around 60,000 inhabitants. Most are coffee and cocoa farmers.

Notable people
 

Léonard-Claude Mpouma (1938-2019), political figure

See also 
 Railway stations in Cameroon
 Transport in Cameroon

References 

Populated places in Littoral Region (Cameroon)